Clapshot is a traditional Scottish dish that originated in Orkney and may be served with haggis, oatcakes, mince, sausages or cold meat. It is created by the combined mashing of swede turnips and potatoes ("neeps and tatties") with the addition of chives, butter or dripping, salt and pepper; some versions include onions. The name is Orcadian in origin.

See also
 List of potato dishes

References

Scottish cuisine
Potato dishes
Orcadian culture